Sankaran may refer to:

Balu Sankaran, Professor, scientist and recipient of Padma Shri and Padma Vibushan awards
C. Sankaran Nair CIE (1857–1934), the President of the Indian National Congress in 1897
Gnani Sankaran (born 1954), popular writer in the Tamil language
Jayanthan Sankaran Nampoothiri, 18th century Diwan of the Travancore kingdom
Kalamandalam Sankaran Embranthiri (1944–2007), one of the most popular Kathakali musicians
N. Sankaran Nair, Indian director of Malayalam movies
M. K. Sankaran Namboothiri (born 1971), Carnatic classical music vocalist from Kerala
Trichy Sankaran (born 1942), South Indian percussionist, composer, scholar, and educator
V. Sankaran, Indian politician and former Member of the Legislative Assembly of Tamil Nadu